Dmitriy Valeryevich Burmakin (born 8 January 1981 in Abakan, Khakassia) is a Russian long-distance runner who specializes in the marathon races.

He finished thirteenth in the marathon at the 2006 European Championships. Before that he had placed lowly at the 2004 Summer Olympics and did not finish at the 2005 World Championships.

International competitions

Personal bests
Half marathon - 1:07:06 hrs (2006)
Marathon - 2:11:20 hrs (2005)

References

sports-reference

1981 births
Living people
People from Abakan
Sportspeople from Khakassia
Russian male long-distance runners
Russian male marathon runners
Olympic male marathon runners
Olympic athletes of Russia
Athletes (track and field) at the 2004 Summer Olympics
World Athletics Championships athletes for Russia
Russian Athletics Championships winners